An anthology film (also known as an omnibus film, package film, or portmanteau film) is a single film consisting of several shorter films, each complete in itself and distinguished from the other, though frequently tied together by a single theme, premise, or author. Sometimes each one is directed by a different director or written by a different author, or may even have been made at different times or in different countries. Anthology films are distinguished from "revue films" such as Paramount on Parade (1930)—which were common in Hollywood in the early decades of sound film, composite films, and compilation films.

Anthology films are often mistaken with hyperlink cinema. Hyperlink cinema shows parts of many stories throughout a film, whereas anthology films show story segments of one at a time. Some mistaken examples include Pulp Fiction (1994) and Amores Perros (2000), distributing their storylines non-chronologically, separated by segments.

Examples

Intolerance (1916)
Grand Hotel (1932)
If I Had a Million (1932)
Tales of Manhattan (1942)
Flesh and Fantasy (1943)
Dead of Night (1945)
L'Amore (1948)
Quartet (1948)
Trio (1950)
Encore (1951)
O. Henry's Full House (1952)
Actors and Sin (1952)
Siamo donne (1953)
Invitation to the Dance (1956)
The Yellow Rolls-Royce (1964)
The Illustrated Man (1968)
From Beyond the Grave (1974)
Trilogy of Terror (1975)
Heavy Metal (1981)
Creepshow (1982)
Twilight Zone: The Movie (1983)
The Company of Wolves (1984)
Creepshow 2 (1987)
New York Stories (1989)
Tales from the Darkside: The Movie (1990)
Twenty Bucks (1993)
Four Rooms (1995) 
Tales from the Hood (1995)
The Red Violin (1998)
Coffee and Cigarettes (2003)Eros (2004)Paris, je t'aime (2006)
Please Do Not Disturb (2010)
V/H/S (2012) 
V/H/S/2 (2013)
V/H/S: Viral (2014)
The Ballad of Buster Scruggs (2018)
Kathasangama (2019)
Omniboat: A Fast Boat Fantasia (2020)
V/H/S/94 (2021)
V/H/S/99 (2022)
V/H/S/85 (2023)

See also
 Anthology series
 Frame tale
 List of animated package films
 List of horror anthology films

References

 
Film styles
Film genres